American Imago is an academic journal established in 1939 by Sigmund Freud and Hanns Sachs. It seeks to explore the role of psychoanalysis in contemporary cultural, literary, and social theory, while also considering issues related to anthropology, philosophy, politics, cultural studies, history, art history, musicology, education, and gender studies.

The current editor-in-chief of the journal is Murray M. Schwartz. Past editors include Louis Rose, Hanns Sachs, Harry Slochower, and George B. Wilbur. The journal is published by the Johns Hopkins University Press.

External links 
 
 American Imago at Project MUSE

Literary magazines published in the United States
Psychoanalysis journals
English-language journals
Quarterly journals
Publications established in 1939
Johns Hopkins University Press academic journals
1939 establishments in the United States
Magazines published in Baltimore